The Minnesota Golden Gophers football team represents the University of Minnesota in college football at the NCAA Division I Football Bowl Subdivision level. Founded in 1882, Minnesota has been a member of the Big Ten Conference since its inception in 1896 as the Western Conference. The Golden Gophers claim seven national championships: 1904, 1934, 1935, 1936, 1940, 1941, and 1960. Since 2009, the Golden Gophers have played all their home games at Huntington Bank Stadium in Minneapolis, Minnesota.

History

The Minnesota Golden Gophers college football team played its first game on September 29, 1882, a 4–0 victory over Hamline University.  Eight years later in 1890, the Gophers played host to Wisconsin in a 63–0 victory.  With the exception of 1906, the Gophers and Badgers have played each other every year since then.  The 132 games played against each other is the most played rivalry in Division I-A college football.

Early years
The sport's beginnings were humble. Students began gathering to play the game recreationally and its popularity grew.

Once the sport had taken off, it was only a matter of time before a team was formed to play against other schools. Early teams were very loosely organized, not requiring all of the players to be students and not having designated coaches. The players on the team started to recruit faculty members who had played football at schools in the East to help organize the team. The team gained their first coach in 1883: Thomas Peebles, a philosophy professor who also recruited a cheer team for the football players, which later established him as the father of American cheerleading. Like many of the early coaches, his term lasted just one year.

Some years, the football team played without a coach. Other years, they played with multiple coaches. In total, from 1882 through 1899, the team played 16 seasons of football and had 15 different coaches. As the years went by, the leadership structure started to become more formal. In 1900, the hiring of Dr. Henry L. Williams, the school’s first full-time salaried coach, signaled the end of the early, chaotic days.

Glory years

The Gophers enjoyed quite a bit of success in the early 20th century, posting winning records from 1900 to 1919. Head coach Henry L. Williams developed the "Minnesota shift", a predecessor to later quick line shifts, which was adopted widely. Also Henry L. Williams led Minnesota to one of the NCAA's longest unbeaten streaks of 35 games, from 1903 to 1905 with 34 wins and 1 tie. In 1932, Bernie Bierman became the Gophers' head coach and led the Gophers to their first dynasty. From 1934 to 1936 the Gophers went on a run of winning three straight National Championships, the last Division I team to accomplish this feat. During the run, Minnesota went unbeaten in 28 straight games, 21 of which were consecutive victories. The school record for consecutive victories is 24, which spanned 3 seasons from 1903 to 1905. Led by halfback Bruce Smith, the Gophers also won two more national championships in 1940 and 1941, with Smith winning the Heisman Trophy in 1941. Those two seasons comprised most of an 18-game winning streak that stretched from 1939 to 1942.

After some mediocre seasons throughout the remainder of the 1940s and 1950s, the Gophers rose back to prominence in 1960 with their seventh national championship (because polling ended after the regular season, the Gophers were crowned AP and UPI national champions despite losing the Rose Bowl to Washington). That national championship followed a 1–8 record in 1958 and 2–7 record in 1959. Minnesota played in bowl games the two following years as well, in 1961 and 1962. The Gophers earned their first berth in the Rose Bowl by winning the 1960 Big Ten title. The following year, Minnesota returned to Pasadena despite a second-place finish in the conference. The Ohio State Buckeyes, the Big Ten champions in 1961, declined an invitation to the Rose Bowl because of tension between academics and athletics at the school.  Minnesota beat UCLA 21–3 to claim its first and only Rose Bowl victory. Minnesota's last Big Ten title was in 1967, tying the Indiana Hoosiers and Purdue Boilermakers atop the standings.

Recent history

After their 8–2 record in 1967, the Gophers did not win 8 games in a season again until they finished 8–4 in 1999. Their 10–3 record in 2003 gave the Gophers their first 10 win season since 1905.

The 2006 team had the dubious distinction of blowing a 38–7 third-quarter lead in the Insight Bowl against Texas Tech, losing 44–41 in overtime. The collapse, which was the biggest in the history of Division I-A postseason football, directly led to the firing of head coach Glen Mason. On January 17, 2007, Tim Brewster was officially announced as the next head coach of the Minnesota Golden Gophers.

In 1981, the Gophers played their last game in Memorial Stadium and played their home games in the Hubert H. Humphrey Metrodome until 2008. The Gophers moved back to campus with a 20–13 win against Air Force on September 12, 2009, when their new home, TCF Bank Stadium, opened.

In 2010, after a 1–6 record to start the season, the Gophers football head coach Tim Brewster was fired. Jeff Horton served as the interim head coach going 2–3. On December 6, 2010, Jerry Kill, former Northern Illinois University head coach, was hired to take over the University of Minnesota football program.

In 2014, The Gophers reached an 8–4 record while going 5–3 in Big Ten games, falling just short of making the Big Ten Championship Game by losing to The Wisconsin Badgers in the season finale.  After being revitalized in the Big Ten contention, The Gophers were awarded an appearance in the Citrus Bowl on January 1 against Missouri.

In 2018, the Gophers defeated the Badgers to reclaim Paul Bunyan's Axe and end a 14 season losing streak.

In 2019, the Gophers turned in a historic season, going 11-2 (7-2 in conference play) including a home victory against No. 4 Penn State 31-26, their first victory over a top 5 team in 20 years. The win also marked the first time since 1904 that the Gophers started out a season 9-0.

Conference affiliations
 Independent (1882–1895)
 Big Ten Conference (1896–present)
 Western Conference (1896–1952)
 Big Ten Conference (1953–present)

All-time Big Ten records

Championships

National championships

Minnesota has been selected nine times as national champions from NCAA-designated major selectors, including four from the major wire-service AP Poll and Coaches Poll. Minnesota claims seven (1904, 1934, 1935, 1936, 1940, 1941, and 1960) of these championships. The 1960 championship is a consensus national championship.

Toledo Cup

The Gophers were the inaugural winners of the Toledo Cup national championship trophy in 1934 and repeated the feat in 1935 and 1936. The poll's rules stated the traveling trophy would be retained permanently by the first team to win it three times; Bernie Bierman's teams completed the three-peat without any other team winning the cup. The Toledo Cup is currently displayed in the lobby of the Gibson-Nagurski Athletic Center at the University of Minnesota.

Rockne Memorial Trophy

Minnesota won Dickinson System national championships in 1934, 1936, and 1940. The three wins gave them permanent possession of the Knute Rockne Memorial Trophy, which had been introduced in 1931. Following tradition, the university set their own new trophy into play and named it for former football coach Henry L. Williams.

With professor Frank Dickinson retiring from the ratings business, the new Williams Trophy was instead linked to the nascent AP Poll and served as the first AP Trophy.

Conference championships
Minnesota has won 18 conference championships, 11 shared and 7 outright.

† Co-champions

Division championships
Big Ten Football adopted divisions in 2011, with the winner of each division playing for the conference championship. The divisions were known as Legends and Leaders from 2011 to 2013. In 2014, the divisions were realigned geographically into East and West. Minnesota competes in the Big Ten West Division. Minnesota has shared one division title, in 2019.

† Co-champions

Bowl games

Minnesota has played in 23 bowl games, amassing a record of 11–12.

Bowl record by game

Head coaches

Rivalries

Wisconsin

The Minnesota-Wisconsin rivalry is the most-played rivalry in the NCAA Division I Football Bowl Subdivision. The winner of the game receives Paul Bunyan's Axe, a tradition that started in 1948 after the first trophy, the Slab of Bacon, disappeared. Minnesota dominated the series for most of the first half of the 20th century, and Wisconsin similarly dominated the series from the early 1990s until 2018, accruing a 14-game win streak for the Badgers which gave Wisconsin its first-ever lead in the series in 2017. Since the end of that streak in 2018, Minnesota leads the series 3-2. The series is tied 62–62–8 through the 2022 season.

Iowa

The winner of the game is awarded the Floyd of Rosedale, 98 lb (44 kg) a bronze pig trophy. The trophy began in 1935, when, in an effort to deescalate tensions between the two teams and fan bases, Minnesota Governor Floyd Olson bet Iowa Governor Clyde L. Herring a prize hog against an Iowa prize hog that Minnesota would win the game. After Minnesota's victory, Governor Herring obtained a pig donated by Rosedale Farms and named the hog after Governor Olson, giving birth to Floyd of Rosedale. Minnesota leads the series with Iowa 62–51–2 through the 2021 season.

Michigan

The Michigan–Minnesota football rivalry is the first and oldest trophy game in college football history. The winner of the game is awarded the Little Brown Jug, a five-gallon earthenware jug. The jug was used by Michigan in the 1903 matchup to prevent Minnesota from tampering with its water supply, and, according to folklore, stolen from Michigan by a Minnesota custodian after the game. Michigan leads the series 76–25–3 with the last game played in 2020.

Penn State

The winner of the game is awarded the Governor's Victory Bell. The Governor's Victory Bell was introduced to mark Penn State's first conference game after being added to the Big Ten Conference, which came against Minnesota in 1993. Penn State leads the series 10–6 with the last game played in 2022.

Nebraska

The winner of the Minnesota-Nebraska game is awarded the $5 Bits of Broken Chair Trophy, which is an unofficial trophy created by fans after a good-humored back and forth between the Twitter accounts for Minnesota mascot Goldy Gopher and a parody account for then-head coach Bo Pelini. The trophy was officially rejected by both universities, although groups associated with each university continue to use the trophy as a fundraiser around the annual matchup. Minnesota leads the series with Nebraska 35–25–2 through the 2021 season.

Facilities

Huntington Bank Stadium

Huntington Bank Stadium is the football stadium for the Minnesota Golden Gophers college football team at the University of Minnesota in Minneapolis, Minnesota. The 52,525-seat on-campus "horseshoe" style stadium is designed to support future expansion to seat up to 80,000 people, and cost $303.3 million to build. The stadium was the temporary home of the Minnesota Vikings of the National Football League for the 2014 and 2015 seasons while U.S. Bank Stadium was being built.

Gibson-Nagurski Football Complex

The complex houses the team administrative offices, locker room, meeting rooms, equipment room, training room, and players’ lounges. It is named after Gopher teammates from the 1920s, George Gibson and Bronko Nagurski.

Former venues

Northrop Field (1899–1923)
Memorial Stadium (1924–1981)
Hubert H. Humphrey Metrodome (1982–2008)

Individual award winners

Retired numbers

Minnesota has retired five jersey numbers.

National

Players
Heisman Trophy
Bruce Smith – 1941 
Outland Trophy
Tom Brown – 1960 
Bobby Bell – 1962 
Greg Eslinger – 2005 
Jim Thorpe Award
Tyrone Carter – 1999 
Dave Rimington Trophy
Greg Eslinger – 2005 
John Mackey Award
Matt Spaeth – 2006

Coaches
Amos Alonzo Stagg Award
Bernie Bierman – 1958 
Eddie Robinson Coach of the Year
Murray Warmath – 1960 
Paul "Bear" Bryant Award
Murray Warmath – 1960

Big Ten Conference

Players
Chicago Tribune Silver Football
Biggie Munn – 1931 
Pug Lund – 1934 
Paul Giel – 1952, 1953 
Tom Brown – 1960 
Sandy Stephens – 1961 
Offensive Lineman of the Year
Greg Eslinger – 2005 
Defensive Lineman of the Year
Karon Riley – 2000 
Freshman of the Year
Darrell Thompson – 1986 
Laurence Maroney – 2003 
Wide Receiver of the Year
Rashod Bateman - 2019
Tight End of the Year
Maxx Williams – 2014
Defensive Back of the Year
Antoine Winfield Jr. - 2019
Punter of the Year
Peter Mortell – 2014

Coach
Glen Mason – 1999
Jerry Kill – 2014
P. J. Fleck – 2019

College Football Hall of Famers

Inductees as of 2017.

Pro Football Hall of Famers
Inductees as of 2017.

Canadian Football Hall of Fame
Inductees as of 2017.

Current professional players

NFL

List current as of January 25, 2023.

Other professional leagues

Other notable coaches and players

Marion Barber Jr. – Retired NFL Running Back 
Phil Bengtson – Retired NFL Head Coach 
Rene Capo – Olympic judoka 
Gino Cappelletti – All-time AFL scoring leader
Eric Decker – Retired NFL Wide Receiver 
Gil Dobie – Won two national championships as head coach of the Cornell Big Red football team 
Tony Dungy – Retired NFL Head Coach 
Verne Gagne – Professional wrestler; founder AWA 
Tony Levine – Head coach of the Houston Cougars football team 
Len Levy – American football player and professional wrestler
Chip Lohmiller – Retired NFL Kicker 
Karl Mecklenburg – Retired NFL Linebacker 
Cory Sauter – Retired NFL Quarterback 
Darrell Thompson – Retired NFL Running Back, current Gophers football radio announcer 
Rick Upchurch – Retired NFL Wide Receiver 
DeWayne Walker – Current defensive backs coach Cleveland Browns 
Murray Warmath – Last head coach to lead Minnesota to the Rose Bowl and National Championship 
Bud Wilkinson – Won three national championships as head coach of the Oklahoma Sooners football team 
Norries Wilson – Head Coach, Columbia Lions football team, first African American head football coach in the Ivy League
Wayne Robinson Retired NFL linebacker, CFL and NFL coach

Future opponents

Big Ten West-division opponents

Minnesota plays the other six Big Ten West opponents once per season.

Big Ten East-division opponents

Non-conference opponents 
Announced schedules as of October 11, 2022 

No opponents currently scheduled for the 2029 and 2031 seasons.

References

External links

 

 
American football teams established in 1882
1882 establishments in Minnesota